Dancing in the Sun is a 1954 West German musical film directed by Géza von Cziffra and starring Cécile Aubry, Franco Andrei and Ursula Justin. It was shot on location in Hamburg and Andalucía.

The film's art direction was by Albrecht Becker and Herbert Kirchhoff. It was shot at the Wandsbek Studios in Hamburg and on location in Spain.

Cast
 Cécile Aubry as Solotänzerin Nanon
 Franco Andrei as Sänger Antonio Avila
 Ursula Justin as Tänzerin Biggi
 Rudolf Platte as Galdos
 Oskar Sima as Don Armando
 Hans Olden as Felipe
 Joseph Offenbach as Theaterdirektor Mendoza
 Helmuth Beck as Orenze
 Max Walter Sieg as Larra
 Ingrid Mirbach as Molly
 Christiane König as Grete
 Peter Frank as Don Ramon
 Angelica Mirete
 Dorle Rath
 Willy Witte
 Hans Greve
 Dr. Kahlen
 Kurt Fuß
 Horst von Otto
 Josef Albrecht
 Karl Meiberg
 Mona Baptiste as Sängerin
 Undine von Medvey as Sängerin
 Teddy Reno as Sänger
 Sunshine Quartett as Gesangsgruppe
 Macky Kaspar as Solotrompeter
 Gert Reinholm as Tänzer
 Erwin Bredow as Tänzer
 Otto Boddin as Tänzer
 Angèle Durand as Sängerin
 Lotar Olias as Music

References

Bibliography
 Gert Koshofer. Color: die Farben des Films. Spiess, 1988.

External links 
 

1954 films
1954 musical comedy films
German musical comedy films
West German films
1950s German-language films
Films directed by Géza von Cziffra
Films set in Spain
Films shot at Wandsbek Studios
1950s German films